The Des Moines Oak Leafs were a minor league professional ice hockey team from Des Moines, Iowa, playing at Des Moines Ice Arena. The Oak Leafs were members of the United States Hockey League from 1961 to 1963, and the International Hockey League from 1963 to 1972. After 1972, the team was renamed the Des Moines Capitols.

External links
 Des Moines Oak Leafs (USHL) at the Internet Hockey Database
 Des Moines Oak Leafs (IHL) at the Internet Hockey Database

International Hockey League (1945–2001) teams
Sports in Des Moines, Iowa
Defunct ice hockey teams in the United States
1961 establishments in Iowa
1972 disestablishments in Iowa
Ice hockey clubs established in 1961
Ice hockey teams in Iowa
Ice hockey clubs disestablished in 1972